Odienné is a town in the northwestern part of Ivory Coast. It is the seat of both Denguélé District and Kabadougou Region. It is also a commune and the seat of and a sub-prefecture of Odienné Department.

The town of Odienné was founded by Malinké people under Vakaba Touré.  Later, Samory Touré founded a support base in the town. Features of Odienné include a large mosque, nearby gold mines, and Vakaba Touré's tomb located in Odienné.

The town is served by Odienné Airport. The Stade Municipal is a multi-purpose stadium in the town. St. Augustine Cathedral serves as the cathedral and headquarters for the Roman Catholic Diocese of Odienné, of which Antoine Koné is the bishop.

History
It is thought that the area surrounding Odienné was first settled by the Senufo people and the Mandinka people. The French explorer René Caillié visited Odienné in 1827. In 1898, during the French occupation of Cote d'Ivoire, a military post was established south of Odienné. During the First Ivorian Civil War, Odienné was a stronghold for Forces Nouvelles de Côte d'Ivoire. Its remote location meant that the town was somewhat peaceful during the war compared to other Ivorian towns.

Economy
Odienné relies on agriculture as its main industry. Fruits, cashews, yams, and cotton is grown in fields located in the Massif du Dienguélé valley. The town houses a rice-processing plant and manganese is also produced in the area.

Sports
Stade Municipal is the primary stadium in Odienné, and is the home of AS Denguélé, the main football club, which currently plays in the Ligue 1 division.

Climate

Villages
The 17 villages of the sub-prefecture of Odienné and their population in 2014 are:

In 2014, the total population of the sub-prefecture of Odienné was 50,506.

References

 
Sub-prefectures of Kabadougou
District capitals of Ivory Coast
Communes of Kabadougou
Regional capitals of Ivory Coast